Good Morning, Vietnam is a 1987 American war comedy film written by Mitch Markowitz and directed by Barry Levinson. Set in Saigon in 1965, during the Vietnam War, the film stars Robin Williams as a radio DJ on Armed Forces Radio Service, who proves hugely popular with the troops, but infuriates his superiors with what they call his "irreverent tendency". The story is loosely based on the experiences of AFRS radio DJ Adrian Cronauer.

Most of Williams' performances that portrayed Cronauer's radio broadcasts were improvisations. The film was released by Buena Vista Pictures (under its Touchstone Pictures banner) to critical and commercial success; for his work in the film, Williams won a Golden Globe Award for Best Actor – Motion Picture Musical or Comedy and was nominated for an Academy Award for Best Actor and a BAFTA Award for Best Actor in a Leading Role. In 2000, the film was number 100 on the American Film Institute's "100 Years...100 Laughs" list, containing 100 movies considered the funniest in American cinema.

Plot
In 1965, Airman Second Class Adrian Cronauer arrives in Saigon to work as a DJ for Armed Forces Radio Service. Private Edward Garlick takes him to the radio station, where his attitude and demeanor contrast sharply with those of many staff members. Cronauer's show starts with his signature "Good morning, Vietnam!", and consists of reading strictly censored news and irreverent humor segments mixed with rock and roll music, which is frowned upon by his superiors, Second Lieutenant Steven Hauk and Sergeant Major Phillip Dickerson. Hauk adheres to strict Army guidelines in terms of humor and music programming while Dickerson is generally abusive to all enlisted men. However, Brigadier General Taylor and the other DJs quickly grow to like Cronauer and his eccentric brand of comedy.

Cronauer follows Trinh, a Vietnamese girl, to an English class; after bribing the teacher to let him take over, Cronauer instructs the students in American slang and profanity. Once class is dismissed, he tries to talk to Trinh but is stopped by her brother Tuan; realizing the futility of pursuing her, Cronauer instead befriends Tuan and takes him to Jimmy Wah's, a local GI bar. Two racist soldiers, angered at Tuan's presence, initiate a confrontation that escalates into a brawl. Dickerson reprimands Cronauer for the incident, though his broadcasts continue as normal, gaining popularity from many listeners in spite of Dickerson and Hauk's dislike.

While relaxing in Jimmy Wah's one afternoon, Cronauer is pulled outside by Tuan, saying that Trinh wants to see him. Moments later, the building explodes, killing two soldiers and leaving Cronauer shaken. The cause of the explosion is determined to be a bomb; Dickerson declares the news censored, but Cronauer locks himself in the studio and reports it anyway, to Dickerson's outrage. Dickerson cuts off the broadcast and Cronauer is suspended, to the delight of Hauk and Dickerson. Hauk takes over the show, but his poor attempts at humor and polka music choices lead to a flood of letters and phone calls demanding that Cronauer be reinstated.

Demoralized, Cronauer spends his time drinking and pursuing Trinh, only to be repeatedly rebuffed. At the radio station, Taylor intervenes, ordering Hauk to reinstate Cronauer, but he refuses to go back to work. Garlick and Cronauer's vehicle is stopped in a congested street amidst a convoy of soldiers from the 1st Infantry Division heading for Nha Trang, where Garlick persuades him to do an impromptu "broadcast" before they go off to fight. The soldiers' appreciation reminds Cronauer why his job is important, and he returns to work.

Dickerson seizes an opportunity to permanently rid himself of Cronauer by approving his request to interview soldiers in the field and routing him through the Viet Cong-controlled highway to An Lộc. Cronauer and Garlick's Jeep hits a mine, and they are forced to hide from VC patrols. In Saigon, Tuan learns of the trip after Cronauer fails to show up for English class and steals a van to go after them. After finding them, the van breaks down and they flag down a Marine helicopter to take them back to the city.

Back at the base, Dickerson tells Cronauer that he is off the air for good after Tuan is revealed as a VC operative known as "Phan Duc To" and the one responsible for the bombing of Jimmy Wah's; Dickerson has arranged for Cronauer's honorable discharge. General Taylor informs Cronauer that, regrettably, he cannot help him since his friendship with Tuan would damage the reputation of the US Army. After Cronauer leaves, Taylor informs Dickerson that he is being transferred to Guam, citing his vindictive attitude as the reason.

Cronauer chases down Tuan, decrying his actions against American soldiers. Emerging from the shadows, Tuan retorts that the US army devastated his village, thereby making the United States his enemy, but comments that he still chose to save Cronauer's life at An Lộc, implying that he valued their friendship, before disappearing again. On his way to the Tan Son Nhat Airport with Garlick, under MP escort, Cronauer sets up a quick softball game for the students from his English class and says goodbye to Trinh. He gives Garlick a taped farewell message and boards the plane; Garlick – taking Cronauer's place as DJ – plays the tape on the air the next morning, it begins with Cronauer saying "Goodbye, Vietnam!"

Cast

Production
The film was made on a production budget of $13 million. Williams was paid "less than $2 million" plus gross participation points.

In 1979, Adrian Cronauer pitched a sitcom based on his experiences as an AFRS DJ. Although one of the most popular television programs of the era was the Korean War period piece M*A*S*H, the networks were not interested, because they did not see war as comedy material. Cronauer then revamped his sitcom into a script for a TV movie of the week, which eventually got the attention of Robin Williams. Very little of Cronauer's original treatment remained after writer Mitch Markowitz was brought in.

Commenting on the accuracy of the film, the real-life Cronauer commented "I'm very happy with it. Of course, it was never intended to be an accurate point-by-point biography. It was intended as a piece of entertainment, and (Williams) was playing a character named Adrian Cronauer who shared a lot of my experiences. But actually, he was playing Robin Williams." Commenting on his portrayal in the film, Cronauer said "Anybody who has been in the military will tell you that if I did half the things in that movie, I’d still be in Leavenworth right now. A lot of Hollywood imagination went into the movie. I was a disc jockey in Vietnam and I did teach English in my spare time. I was not thrown out of Vietnam; I stayed for my full one-year tour and I was honorably discharged." None of the people in the film are based on actual people Cronauer met, although he described them as stereotypes of military personnel who existed at the time. The scenes where Cronauer teaches his class to swear and use "street slang", his pursuit of a Vietnamese woman, and his Jeep being blown up in the jungle, among others, are constructs for the plot and never happened to Cronauer. He did, however, witness the bombing of a restaurant he had only recently left, and clash with Army censors when prevented from reporting it.

According to Cronauer, he and Williams were forbidden by Levinson to meet each other because the director "was afraid that if Robin and I met, that Robin would somehow start to do an unconscious imitation of me, which would change his characterization." Williams and Cronauer eventually met at the film's New York premiere.

Reception

Critical response

Good Morning, Vietnam was one of the most successful films of the year, becoming the fourth highest-grossing film of 1987.

The film received acclaim from film critics. Roger Ebert and Gene Siskel of the review show Siskel and Ebert awarded the film "Two Thumbs Up", with Ebert giving the film a four out of four star review in the Chicago Sun-Times. Richard Corliss of Time called the film "the best military comedy since M*A*S*H", and named it one of the best films of the year. Vincent Canby of The New York Times called the film a cinematic "tour de force" and described Williams' performance as "the work of an accomplished actor". Much of the acclaim went to Williams' performance, a role that earned him an Oscar nomination for Best Actor.

The film was not without detractors. Hal Hinson of The Washington Post, gave the film a negative review. While praising Williams, he felt the film was "compulsory and condescending", and that the film was merely "a Robin Williams concert movie welded clumsily onto the plot from an old Danny Kaye picture."

Rotten Tomatoes gives the film a score of 89% based on reviews from 46 critics, with an average rating of 7.4/10. The website's critical consensus states: "A well-calibrated blend of manic comedy and poignant drama, Good Morning, Vietnam offers a captivating look at a wide range of Robin Williams' cinematic gifts." On Metacritic, the film has a score of 67% based on reviews from 15 critics, indicating "generally favorable reviews". Audiences surveyed by CinemaScore gave the film a grade of A−.

Accolades

 AMC named Good Morning, Vietnam one of the 20 greatest war movies of all time.
 In 2000, American Film Institute included the film in AFI's 100 Years...100 Laughs (#100).

Music

Score
Alex North's score was released by Intrada Records in 2017. As the complete work runs for just 17 minutes, it was paired with David Newman's Operation Dumbo Drop.

Soundtrack
The soundtrack album was certified platinum in the US. Louis Armstrong's "What a Wonderful World" was released as a single because of the film and reached #32 on the US Top 40, 20 years after its original release. The album won the Grammy Award for Best Comedy Album in 1989.

 Track list
 Robin Williams – "Adrian Cronauer" (2:09)
 Martha Reeves & The Vandellas – "Nowhere to Run" (2:55)
 The Beach Boys – "I Get Around" (2:09)
 Wayne Fontana & The Mindbenders – "The Game of Love" (2:04)
 Robin Williams – "Adrian Cronauer" (0:15)
 The Searchers – "Sugar and Spice" (2:13)
 Robin Williams – "Adrian Cronauer" (0:47)
 The Castaways – "Liar, Liar" (1:51)
 The Beach Boys – "The Warmth of the Sun" (2:47)
 Robin Williams – "Adrian Cronauer" (0:34)
 James Brown – "I Got You (I Feel Good)" (2:44)
 Robin Williams – "Adrian Cronauer" (0:08)
 Them – "Baby, Please Don't Go" (2:40)
 Robin Williams – "Adrian Cronauer" (0:33)
 The Marvelettes – "Danger Heartbreak Dead Ahead" (2:28)
 The Vogues – "Five O'Clock World" (2:19)
 The Rivieras – "California Sun" (2:22)
 Robin Williams – "Adrian Cronauer" (1:21)
 Louis Armstrong – "What a Wonderful World" (2:17)

The tracks titled "Adrian Cronauer" are comedy monologues performed by Williams in character from the film.

Certifications and sales

Cancelled sequel

In 1992, Mark Frost wrote a sequel screenplay, Good Morning, Chicago. The film would have featured Williams, reprising his role as Cronauer, as a journalist at the 1968 Democratic National Convention in Chicago, Illinois. The project was eventually scrapped, due to disagreements between Williams, Levinson, and Disney, over the film's direction.

References

External links

 
 
 
 
 

1980s war comedy films
1987 films
American war comedy films
American Forces Network
Comedy films based on actual events
1980s English-language films
Films scored by Alex North
Films about radio people
Films directed by Barry Levinson
Films featuring a Best Musical or Comedy Actor Golden Globe winning performance
Films set in 1965
Films set in the 1960s
Films shot in Bangkok
Films shot in Thailand
Military humor in film
Touchstone Pictures films
Vietnam War films
Films set in Saigon
Films about the United States Air Force
1980s American films
English-language comedy films